Luan Dias da Silva (born 31 July 1997), known as Luan Dias, is a Brazilian footballer who plays as an attacking midfielder for Água Santa.

Club career
Luan Dias was born in Santos, São Paulo, and finished his formation with Água Santa. He made his first team debut in 2017, becoming a regular starter afterwards and helping in the side's promotion from the Campeonato Paulista Série A2 in 2019.

On 13 July 2020, Luan Dias renewed his contract with the club until 2025. On 6 August, he was loaned to Série B side Ponte Preta until the end of the season.

Back to the Netuno in February 2021, Luan Dias moved to Goiás also in the second division on 2 June, also in a temporary deal. On 4 December, after helping in the latter's promotion to the Série A, it was announced that he would return to his parent club for the 2022 Campeonato Paulista, and subsequently rejoin Goiás on loan for the Série A.

After spending the first three months of the 2022 campaign nursing an injury, Luan Dias returned to Goiás and made his top tier debut on 28 May 2022, coming on as a late substitute for Elvis in a 1–1 home draw against Red Bull Bragantino.

Career statistics

References

External links
Goiás profile 

1997 births
Living people
Sportspeople from Santos, São Paulo
Brazilian footballers
Association football midfielders
Campeonato Brasileiro Série A players
Campeonato Brasileiro Série B players
Esporte Clube Água Santa players
Associação Atlética Ponte Preta players
Goiás Esporte Clube players